The Smashing Pumpkins 1991–1998 is a promotional-only greatest hits compilation album by alternative rock band the Smashing Pumpkins. It features all the commercial singles from the band's first four studio albums, the soundtrack-only tracks "Drown" and "Eye", and a cover of Fleetwood Mac's "Landslide", previously released on the 1994 collection Pisces Iscariot.

Track listing

The Smashing Pumpkins compilation albums
Virgin Records compilation albums
1999 compilation albums